The 1981 Missouri Tigers football team represented the University of Missouri during the 1981 NCAA Division I-A football season. They participated in the Big 8 Conference and played their home games at Faurot Field in Columbia, Missouri. The Tigers were led by head coach Warren Powers and finished the season with a record of 8–4 overall, 3–4 in Big 8 play. They were invited play in the Tangerine Bowl, in which they defeated Southern Miss by a score of 19–17.

Schedule
*Schedule Source:

Season summary

Oklahoma

    
    
    
    
    
    

Missouri's first win versus Oklahoma since 1969.

References

Missouri
Missouri Tigers football seasons
Citrus Bowl champion seasons
Missouri Tigers football